Neurobasis is a genus of damselflies belonging to the family Calopterygidae.
They are found from India, through south-east Asia, Indonesia and New Guinea.

Species 
The genus contains the following species:
Neurobasis anderssoni 
Neurobasis anumariae 
Neurobasis australis  - Papuan Demoiselle
Neurobasis awamena 
Neurobasis chinensis 
Neurobasis daviesi 
Neurobasis florida 
Neurobasis ianthinipennis 
Neurobasis kaupi 
Neurobasis kimminsi 
Neurobasis longipes 
Neurobasis luzoniensis 
Neurobasis subpicta

References

Calopterygidae
Zygoptera genera
Odonata of Asia
Taxa named by Edmond de Sélys Longchamps
Damselflies